Kinetoskias is a genus of bryozoans belonging to the family Bugulidae.

The genus has cosmopolitan distribution.

Species:

Kinetoskias arborescens 
Kinetoskias beringi 
Kinetoskias cyathus 
Kinetoskias elegans 
Kinetoskias elongata 
Kinetoskias mitsukurii 
Kinetoskias oblongata 
Kinetoskias pocillum 
Kinetoskias sileni 
Kinetoskias smitti 
Kinetoskias vegae

References

Bryozoan genera